Ivnyansky District is an administrative district (raion), one of the twenty-one in Belgorod Oblast, Russia. Municipally, it is incorporated as Ivnyansky Municipal District. It is located in the northwest of the oblast. Its administrative center is the urban locality (a settlement) of Ivnya. Population:   24,468 (2002 Census);  The population of Ivnya accounts for 33.0% of the district's total population.

References

Notes

Sources

Districts of Belgorod Oblast